The Burgdorf District (not to be confused with the Burgdorf District in Switzerland) is a former district (Landkreis) in Germany. It existed from 1885 to 1974, when it was absorbed in the Hanover District and subsequently in the Hanover Region. Its area corresponds roughly to the present day municipalities of Wedemark, Isernhagen, Burgwedel, Burgdorf, Uetze, Lehrte and Sehnde.

Geography 
The district comprised the localities of the present day cities
 Burgdorf,
 Burgwedel,
 Lehrte (without Hämelerwald),
 Sehnde (without the villages Bolzum, Müllingen, Wassel, Wehmingen and Wirringen)
and the present-day municipalities
 Isernhagen,
 Uetze (without the villages Dedenhausen and Eltze),
 Wedemark
as well as Oelerse (today part of Edemissen), Harber (today part of Hohenhameln), Landwehr and Röhrse (today part of Peine) as well as Isernhagen-Süd (today part of Hannover).

Districts of Prussia
1885 establishments in Germany
1974 disestablishments in Germany
States and territories established in 1885
States and territories disestablished in 1974
Hanover Region